Vera Helfrid Victoria Sandberg (born 23 May 1895 at Hångers gård (Eng:Hångers farm) in Ljungby; died 24 December 1979 in Stockholm) was a Swedish engineer. In 1917, she became Sweden's first female engineer.

Biography
Vera Sandberg grew up at Långasjönäs in Asarums parish in the province of Blekinge. When she entered Chalmers University of Technology in 1914 she was the only woman among 500 male students. In 1917, she achieved her degree in chemistry, and after that she started working at AB Skandinaviska Raffineriet in Partille, as well as positions at Oljefabriken i Karlshamn, Helsingborgs Gummifabrik and at Sieverts Kabelverk in Sundbyberg. She married engineer Ragnar Adolf Resare in 1937. The couple resided in Storfors for several years, when she mainly focused on her family. Until 1965 she was part-owner of Långasjönäs Pappersbruk and was included in the board on a regular basis.

Legacy

Vera Sandberg has given her name to several things, among other:
 Chalmersspexet Vera, spex performed by Chalmers Students' Union.
 Vera Sandbergs Allé, allée in Gothenburg.
 One of Chalmer's hot-air balloons.
 A conference room at Chalmer's student union building, called Veras Gräsmatta (Vera's Lawn).
 Chalmer's team, Chalmers Vera Team, in the competition Eco Marathon.
 Vera Sandbergs gata, a street in Ljungby.

In June 2019, a statue was unveiled in her honour by Chalmers University of Technology on Vera Sandberg Avenue in Gothenburg, created by sculptor Jan Cardell.

Sources
 Sveriges dödbok 1947-2006, (CD-ROM), Sveriges Släktforskarförbund
 Svenska DagblExterna links - Vera Resare (1979-12-30)

Further reading
 

Swedish engineers
1895 births
1979 deaths
Swedish women engineers
20th-century Swedish engineers
20th-century women engineers
People from Ljungby Municipality
Chalmers University of Technology alumni
20th-century Swedish women